eExtra (sometimes called e.tv Extra) is a South African digital satellite television channel owned by eMedia Holdings, offering a variety of lifestyle, dramas, telenovelas, court shows, sitcoms and movies.

History
e.tv as a broadcaster launched eKasi+,eToonz+, eMovies+ and eAfrica+ as new sister channels as the first of its planned set of TV channels for digital terrestrial television (DTT). e.tv, the SABC and M-Net plan to each roll out their own collections of additional TV channels in South Africa eventually.

The networks will eventually be a part of South Africa's digital terrestrial television system, but began airing over OpenView HD while the launch of DTT is coordinated. as eToonz+ along with eKasi+ (now eExtra), eAfrica+(now defunct) and eMovies+(now eMovies).

eKasi+ was later added to the StarSat platform on 17 December 2015.

The network was rebranded as eExtra was launched on 1 April 2017 on Openview HD and StarSat . It was later added to DStv on 17 May of the same year. In 2021, the eKasi branding was revived as an eReality programme block in June.

On April 1, 2022, eExtra and three other e.tv services were going to be removed from DStv but the channel remained on DStv for another 2 months as the eMedia Investments filed an application to the Competition Tribunal regarding their carriage agreement with MultiChoice.

By the end of May 2022, the channel ceased transmission on the DStv platform alongside eToonz, eExtra, eMovies and eMovies Extra.

In August 2022, eMovies alongside eMovies Extra, eExtra and eToonz were reinstated on the DStv platform for another 6 months following pending investigation.

Programming

eExtra broadcasts telenovelas, along with a general entertainment schedule of sitcoms, dramas, films, reality and American court shows. The telenovelas are dubbed in English and sourced from domestic Turkish networks, the American Telemundo network, Zee TV, and SBS.

Kuiertyd
In October 2018, eExtra started an Afrikaans block known as Kuiertyd, which mainly features dubbed Turkish telenovelas and a daily 20:00 news bulletin:

In April 2022, it was announced the brand would get a dedicated channel targeted toward their Turkish offering known as ePlesier.

References

External links

Television stations in South Africa
Television channels and stations established in 2013
Television channels and stations established in 2017